Entoloma sericellum is a species of mushroom-forming fungus belonging to the family Entolomataceae. It appears in conifer and hardwood forests.

The cap is dry, white, and covered by tiny fribrils. The gills are white and fragile. The stipe is thin, white, and sometimes translucent. The cap and stipe yellow in age, while the gills turn pinkish from the spores as they mature.

The species is inedible.

References

Entolomataceae
Inedible fungi
Taxa named by Elias Magnus Fries
Fungi described in 1818
Fungi of Europe
Fungi of North America